Lipany is a part of Vitice village in Central Bohemian Region, Czech Republic. It is located 40 km east of Prague and 7 km southeast of Český Brod. The population is 96 (2005). Known for its famous church of Saint Martin 

Battle of Lipany took place between Lipany and Vitice on 30 May 1434.

Populated places in Kolín District
Neighbourhoods in the Czech Republic